Gulf City is an unincorporated community in Hillsborough County, Florida, United States, near Ruskin.

History 
Gulf City was founded by British pirate Ben Margoza in the mid-17th century. It went into decline in the 19th century. In 1895 it was listed as having a population of 76 people, and a post office. The town site is now the location of several housing developments.

References

Former populated places in Hillsborough County, Florida
Former populated places in Florida